The 1990–91 Primera División season was the second category of the Spanish basketball league system during the 1990–91 season. It was the second played with the name of Primera División.

Format 
16 teams played this season.

Regular Season
League of 16 teams in a single group where they play all against all in two rounds.

Second Phase
Group A1, made up of those classified in 1st, 4th, 5th and 8th positions.
Group A2, made up of those classified in the 2nd, 3rd, 6th and 7th positions.
Group B1, made up of those classified in positions 9th, 12th, 13th and 16th.
Group B2, made up of those classified in the 10th, 11th, 14th and 15th positions.

Promotion playoffs
The first 3 of groups A1 and A2; plus the champions of groups B1 and B2 play two rounds of knockout rounds for promotion. The first round is the best of 3 matches (first and third matches are played at the home of the best classified in the regular season) and the second to the best of 5 (first, third and fifth matches are played at the home of the best classified in the regular season). The two winners go up to the ACB League.

Relegation playoffs
The last of groups A1 and A2 together with the 2nd classified of groups B1 and B2 play an intermediate tie to the best of 3 games (first and third matches are played at the home of the best classified in the regular season). The winners keep the category, while the losers have to play another round to decide who goes down.
The last 2 classifieds in groups B1 and B2 play a best of 3 games. The losers go down to the 'Segunda División' and the winners have to play one more tie against the losers of the intermediate to the best of 5 games (first, third and fifth games are played at the home of the best classified in the regular season). The winners keep the category.

Teams

Promotion and relegation (pre-season) 
A total of 16 teams contested the league, including 10 sides from the 1989–90 season, two relegated from the 1989–90 ACB and four promoted from the Segunda División. CAB Obradoiro was not admitted by the FEB and was replaced by Loyola Easo, who obtained a relegation place the previous season.

Teams relegated from Liga ACB
Gran Canaria
Tenerife AB

Teams promoted from Segunda División
CB Azuqueca
Digsa Loja
Santa Coloma
CAB Cartagena

Venues and locations

Regular season

Second Phase

Group A1

Group A2

Group B1

Group B2

PlayOffs

Promotion playoffs 

Semifinal winners are promoted to Liga ACB.

Intermediate playoff 
Winners remain in the category next season and the losers play the second round of the relegation play-off.

|}

Relegation playoffs

First Round 

|}

Second Round 

|}

Final standings

References

External links
League at JM Almenzar website
hispaligas.net

Primera División B de Baloncesto
1990–91 in Spanish basketball
Second level Spanish basketball league seasons